Heksenetter (Witch Nights) is a Norwegian drama film from 1954, directed by Leif Sinding. Georg Løkkeberg appears in the main role as Major General Arthur Ranlow.

Plot
The great war is in its final stages, and Major General Arthur Ranlow orders an attack on the enemy's nuclear facilities. He has an entirely personal motive for the attack because the officers he assigns are men that he suspects are flirting with his wife. All four officers die during the attack.

The plot moves forward in time, and Ranlow is in his living room. Sergeant Sander is his servant, and their existence is marked by occult interests. In their conversation, it appears that Ranlow has been fired from the army. Sander draws the curtains when he sees a strange woman outside. Ranlow orders her to enter the house and, when that happens, Ranlow's health and mental condition deteriorate.

Cast
Georg Løkkeberg: Major General Arthur Ranlow
Bab Christensen: Lilian
Bjarne Andersen: Sergeant Sander, servant
Fridtjof Mjøen: Robert Norvald, doctor
Ingerid Vardund: Vera Ranlow
Rolf Falkenberg Smith: Major Venge
Bjørn Bergh-Pedersen: Major Tregenna
Folkman Schaanning: theater director
Hjalmar Fries: Dr. Thorne
Arvid Nilssen: cemetery worker
Egil Hjorth-Jenssen: cemetery worker
Richard Røgeberg: Lieutenant Lanner
Wenche Løfsgård: woman in a nightclub
Sidsel Meyer: woman in a nightclub
Pelle Christensen: singer in a nightclub
René Jacquet: advertising poster man
Torhild Lindal: nurse
Grethe Dahl: nurse
Edith Ottosen: woman in a nightclub
Oscar Amundsen: man in a nightclub
Per Aaeng: young man with the theater director
Kristin Larssen: little girl
Margaret Pollen: dancer in a nightclub
William Lewis: theater dancer

References

External links
 
 Heksenetter at the National Library of Norway

1954 films
Norwegian drama films
1954 drama films
Norwegian black-and-white films
1950s Norwegian-language films
Films directed by Leif Sinding